Edward J. Lopez is the BB&T Distinguished Professor of Capitalism at Western Carolina University and President of the Public Choice Society.

Biography

Early life
He received a B.S. in economics from Texas A&M University and his Ph.D. from George Mason University in 1997.

Career
Before joining the faculty of San Jose State University in the fall of 2005, he held appointments at the University of North Texas, San Jose State University and George Mason University, and he served as staff economist on the Joint Economic Committee of Congress.

Lopez has authored numerous books, including The Pursuit of Justice and Property Rights. His most recent publication Madmen, Intellectuals, and Academic Scribblers is co-authored with Wayne A. Leighton.

References

Living people
George Mason University alumni
San Jose State University faculty
American economics writers
American male non-fiction writers
American economists
American political writers
Western Carolina University faculty
Year of birth missing (living people)